Semuto is a town in the Central Region of Uganda. It is one of the urban centers in Nakaseke District.

Semuto town will merge with Kapeeka to form the Semuto municipality.

Location
The coordinates of the town are 0°37'12.0"N, 32°19'40.0"E (Latitude:0.620000; Longitude:32.327778).

Overview
Semuto is located along the Matugga–Kapeeka Road. The road goes through Gombe in Wakiso District and Semuto. The road was upgraded from gravel to bitumen at an estimated cost of US$20 million. 65 percent of the funding was provided by the government of Uganda, while 35 percent was provided by the Nordic Development Fund. The work was carried out by China Chongqing International Construction Corporation. COWI A/S, a Danish consultancy firm, supervised the work. Construction was completed in late 2011.

Population
In August 2014, the national census and household survey enumerated the population of Semuto Town Council at 10,935 people. Today the population of Semuto is estimated at 21,027 people.

Points of interest
The following additional points of interest are found within the town limits or close to the edges of town: (a) the offices of Semuto Town Council (b) the Matugga–Kapeeka Road, going through the middle of town in a south to north direction. (c) Semuto central market (d) Semuto Health Center IV, a health facility administered by Nakaseke District local government. (e) Semuto Church of Uganda, a place of worship belonging to the Church of Uganda. (f) Hudani Manji Limited, a chicken processing factory

See also
Luwero Triangle

References

External links
COWI Consultancy: Matugga-Semuto-Kapeeka Road, Uganda

Populated places in Central Region, Uganda
Cities in the Great Rift Valley
Nakaseke District